NBA 2K3 is a 2002 sports video game developed by Visual Concepts and published by Sega for GameCube, PlayStation 2 and Xbox.

It was the first of three consecutive NBA 2K games to be produced with licensing from ESPN (however, the ESPN logo would not appear on the front cover until the series' next installment. The ESPN licensing coincided with its, and sister network ABC's, takeover of the national broadcast TV rights from NBC that occurred at the start of the 2002–03 season.

Reception

The game received "favorable" reviews on all platforms according to video game review aggregator Metacritic. It was nominated for GameSpots annual "Best Traditional Sports Game on GameCube" award, but lost to NFL 2K3.

References

External links

2002 video games
GameCube games
Multiplayer and single-player video games
3
PlayStation 2 games
Sega video games
Video games developed in the United States
Video games set in 2002
Video games set in 2003
Xbox games

Preceded by: NBA 2K2